Bridgeville is an unincorporated community located in Bracken County, Kentucky, United States. Their Post Office  is no longer in service.

References

Unincorporated communities in Bracken County, Kentucky
Unincorporated communities in Kentucky